This is a list of butterflies of Jordan. About 81 species are known from Jordan.

Hesperiidae
Carcharodus stauderi ambiguus (Verity, 1925)
Carcharodus stauderi ramses Reverdin, 1914
Gegenes nostrodamus nostrodamus (Fabricius, 1793)
Gegenes pumilio pumilio (Hoffmannsegg, 1804)
Muschampia proteides proteides (Wagner, 1929)
Pelopidas thrax thrax (Hübner, [1821])
Pyrgus melotis melotis (Duponchel, [1834])
Spialia doris amenophis (Reverdin, 1914)
Spialia orbifer hilaris (Staudinger, 1901)
Thymelicus lineolus lineolus (Ochsenheimer, 1808)
Thymelicus sylvestris syriacus (Tutt, [1905])

Lycaenidae
Anthene amarah amarah (Guerin-Meneville, 1849)
Aricia agestis agestis ([Denis & Schiffermüller], 1775)
Azanus jesous gamra (Lederer, 1855)
Cigaritis acamas acamas (Klug, 1834)
Cigaritis acamas egyptiaca (Riley, 1925)
Cigaritis myrmecophila myrmecophila Dumont, 1922
Deudorix livia livia (Klug, 1834)
Freyeria trochylus trochylus (Freyer, [1843])
Iolana alfierii alfierii Wiltshire, 1948
Iolaus glaucus Butler,  1886
Kretania nicholli cleopatra (Hemming, 1934)
Kretania philbyi philbyi (Graves, 1925)
Lampides boeticus boeticus (Linnaeus, 1767)
Leptotes pirithous pirithous (Linnaeus, 1767)
Luthrodes galba galba (Lederer, 1855)
Lycaena phlaeas phlaeas (Linnaeus, 1761)
Lycaena phlaeas timeus (Cramer, [1777])
Lycaena thersamon thersamon (Esper, [1784])
Plebejidea loewii lockarti (Hemming, 1929)
Plebejidea loewii uranicola (Walker, 1870)
Pseudophilotes abencerragus nabataeus (Graves, 1925)
Tarucus balkanicus balkanicus (Freyer, [1843])
Tarucus rosaceus rosaceus (Austaut, 1885)
Tomares nesimachus nesimachus (Oberthür, 1893)
Zizeeria karsandra karsandra (Moore, 1865)

Papilionidae
Archon apollinus bellargus (Staudinger, [1892])
Papilio alexanor judaeus  Staudinger, [1894]
Papilio machaon syriacus  Pfeiffer, 1931
Papilio saharae saharae  Oberthür, 1879
Zerynthia cerisyi cerisyi (Godart, 1822)
Zerynthia deyrollei deyrollei (Oberthür, 1869)

Pieridae
Anaphaeis aurota aurota (Fabricius, 1793)
Aporia crataegi augustior  Graver, 1925
Colotis chrysonome chrysonome (Klug, 1829)
Colotis fausta fausta (Olivier, [1804])
Colotis phisadia palaestinensis (Staudinger, [1898])
Colotis phisadia phisadia (Godart, [1819])
Euchloe ausonia taurica  Röber, [1907]
Euchloe belemia belemia (Esper, [1800])
Euchloe belemia palaestinensis  Röber, [1907]
Euchloe charlonia charlonia (Donzel, 1842)
Euchloe crameri aegyptiaca  Verity, 1911
Pieris brassicae brassicae (Linnaeus, 1758)
Pieris pseudorapae pseudorapae  Verity, 1908
Pieris rapae rapae (Linnaeus, 1758)
Pontia daplidice daplidice (Linnaeus, 1758)
Pontia glauconome glauconome  Klug, 1829
Zegris eupheme tigris  Riley, 1921
Zegris eupheme uarda  Hemming, 1929

Nymphalidae

Danainae
Danaus chrysippus chrysippus (Linnaeus, 1758)

Charaxinae
Charaxes jasius jasius (Linnaeus, 1767)

Limenitidinae
Limenitis reducta herculeana  Stichel, [1908]

Nymphalinae
Melitaea arduinna evanescens  Staudinger, 1886
Melitaea deserticola macromaculata  Belter, 1934
Melitaea fascelis fascelis (Fabricius, 1787)
Melitaea persea persea  Kollar, [1849]
Melitaea punica telona  Fruhstorfer, 1908
Polygonia egea egea Cramer, [1775])
Vanessa atalanta atalanta (Linnaeus, 1758)
Vanessa cardui cardui (Linnaeus, 1758)

Satyrinae
Chazara anthe hanifa (Herrich-Schaeffer, 1850)
Hipparchia fatua fatua (Freyer, 1844)
Hyponephele lupina intermedia (Staudinger, 1886)
Lasiommata megera transcaspica (Staudinger, 1901)
Maniola telmessia telmessia (Zeller, 1847)
Melanargia titea titania  Calberla, 1891
Pseudochazara pelopea pelopea (Klug, 1832)
Pseudochazara telephassa telephassa (Geyer, [1827])
Pseudotergumia pisidice pisidice (Klug, 1832)
Ypthima asterope asterope (Klug, 1832)

References

Butterflies
J
Jordan

Butterflies
Jordan